Arthur George Walker  (20 October 1861 – 13 September 1939) was an English sculptor and painter. Among his best-known works are several war memorials and the statue of Florence Nightingale in Waterloo Place, London.

Personal life

Arthur George Walker was born 20 October 1861 to Robert Walker and his wife in Hackney, London. Robert Walker was a ship owner and surveyor. Until 1911, Walker lived with his Aunt Isabella and two siblings, Emily and Harold. He studied at the Royal Academy from about 1883 to 1887 and during this time won various prizes. He died aged 77 on 13 September 1939 in England.

Works

War Memorials

Memorials to individuals and other statues

Other works

References

Sources

External links

 
 Royal Academy of Arts profile

1861 births
1939 deaths
English male sculptors
Modern sculptors
People from Hackney Central
20th-century British sculptors
19th-century British sculptors
Royal Academicians
19th-century British male artists
Sculptors from London